Bir Anzarane is a town in the disputed area of Western Sahara. It is administered by Morocco as a rural commune in Oued Ed-Dahab Province in the region of Dakhla-Oued Ed-Dahab. At the time of the 2004 census, the commune had a total population of 6597 people living in 262 households.

References

Populated places in Oued Ed-Dahab Province
Rural communes of Dakhla-Oued Ed-Dahab